Gimry fighting took place between January 2 – January 5, 2006, near the village of Gimry in Daghestan.

The battle

The fighting happened on a mountain between some 3,000 Russian troops, including 1,500 special forces on one side and a group of estimated up to eight armed rebels (or 30 according to the Kavkaz Center version). The government forces were led by the Dagestani Interior Minister Adilgerei Magomedtagirov (the Ministry said the militant group included suspects in a recent assassination attempt on the Deputy Interior Minister that left his son dead).

Despite heavy artillery and aerial bombardment all the fighters managed to escape the encirclement back to the village, leaving behind only an abandoned dugout. At least three OMON and Spetznaz servicemen died and more than 10 were wounded in a three-day battle, some of them possibly by friendly fire. According to the separatist website, more than 50 Russian troops were "eliminated".

The government's plans to pacify the village of Gimry were initially dropped because of the village's symbolical importance as the historical birthplace of Imam Shamil. The large-scale cleansing operation in the village was however carried out in the winter of 2007-2008.

References

External links
GIMRI RE-EMERGES AS ANTI-RUSSIAN STRONGHOLD IN DAGESTAN The Jamestown Foundation, January 12, 2006
Tough lessons in defiant Dagestan BBC News, 19 June 2006

2006 in Russia
Battles of the Second Chechen War
Battles involving Chechnya
Caucasian Front (militant group)
History of Dagestan
January 2006 events in Europe
Battles in 2006